Hate crime laws in the United States are state and federal laws intended to protect against hate crimes (also known as bias crimes).  Although state laws vary, current statutes permit federal prosecution of hate crimes committed on the basis of a person's characteristics of race, religion, ethnicity, nationality, gender, sexual orientation, and/or gender identity. The U.S. Department of Justice (DOJ), Federal Bureau of Investigation (FBI), and campus police departments are required to collect and publish hate crime statistics.

By definition, hate crimes are based on the perpetrator's motivations, which are intrinsically unknowable unless the perpetrator announces them, which means United States hate crime convictions by definition always involve United States free speech exceptions.

Federal

Title I of the Civil Rights Act of 1968 

Title I of the Civil Rights Act of 1968, enacted (b)(2), permits federal prosecution of anyone who "willfully injures, intimidates or interferes with, or attempts to injure, intimidate or interfere with ... any person because of his race, color, religion or national origin" or because of the victim's attempt to engage in one of six types of federally protected activities, such as attending school, patronizing a public place/facility, applying for employment, acting as a juror in a state court, or voting.

People convicted of violating this law face a fine or imprisonment of up to one year, or both. If bodily injury results or if such acts of intimidation involve the use of firearms, explosives or fire, individuals can receive prison terms of up to 10 years, while crimes involving kidnapping, sexual assault, or murder can be punishable by life in prison or the death penalty. U.S. District Courts provide for criminal sanctions only.

Violent Crime Control and Law Enforcement Act (1994) 

The Violent Crime Control and Law Enforcement Act, enacted in  note Sec. 280003, requires the United States Sentencing Commission to increase the penalties for hate crimes committed on the basis of the actual or perceived race, color, religion, national origin, ethnicity, or gender of any person. In 1995, the Sentencing Commission implemented these guidelines, which only apply to federal crimes.

Church Arson Prevention Act (1996) 
The S. 1980 (104th): Church Arson Prevention Act of 1996  was introduced to Congress on June 19, 1996, but died because the Senate Committee found some places for improvement of the bill. It was sponsored by Republican Duncan Faircloth. On May 23, 1996, the House of Representatives introduced H.R. 3525 (104th): Church Arson Prevention Act. The Act was passed by both houses in Congress and signed by President Bill Clinton on July 3, 1996. This bill became law number Pub.L. 104–155. It was sponsored by Republican Henry Hyde. The bill was summarized by the Congressional Research Service as follows: "[the Church Arson Prevention Act of 1996] makes Federal criminal code prohibitions against, and penalties for, damaging religious property or obstructing any person's free exercise of religious beliefs applicable where the offense is in, or affects, interstate commerce." One of the changes in the bill was the sentence increase for "defacing or destroying any religious real property because of race, color, or ethnic characteristics..." from 10 to 20 years. It also changed the statute of limitations from five years to seven years after the date the crime was committed. It reauthorizes the Hate Crimes Statistics Act.

Matthew Shepard and James Byrd, Jr. Hate Crimes Prevention Act (2009) 

On October 28, 2009, President Obama signed the Matthew Shepard and James Byrd, Jr. Hate Crimes Prevention Act, attached to the National Defense Authorization Act for Fiscal Year 2010, which expanded existing United States federal hate crime law to apply to crimes motivated by a victim's actual or perceived gender, sexual orientation, gender identity, or disability, and dropped the prerequisite that the victim be engaging in a federally protected activity.

Emmett Till Antilynching Act (2022) 

On March 29, 2022, President Joe Biden signed the Emmett Till Antilynching Act, which expanded existing United States federal hate crime law to apply to the crime of lynching, defining it as an act of two or more people in a conspiracy to maim or kill a person based on real or perceived traits of a victim as protected under federal law. It was the first anti-lynching bill to be passed by Congress following over 200 bills filed since the Reconstruction era.

State and district 
Forty-seven states and the District of Columbia have statutes criminalizing various types of bias-motivated violence or intimidation (the exceptions being Arkansas, South Carolina, and Wyoming). Georgia, whose hate crime statute was struck down by the Georgia Supreme Court in 2004, passed a new hate crime law in June 2020. Each of these statutes covers bias on the basis of race, religion, and ethnicity; 34 cover disability; 34 of them cover sexual orientation; 30 cover gender; 22 cover transgender/gender-identity; 14 cover age; 6 cover political affiliation. and 3 along with Washington, D.C. cover homelessness.

Thirty-four states and the District of Columbia have statutes creating a civil cause of action, in addition to the criminal penalty, for similar acts.

Thirty states and the District of Columbia have statutes requiring the state to collect hate crime statistics; 20 of these cover sexual orientation.

Twenty-seven states plus the District of Columbia have statutes that specifically cover gender.

Eighteen states have hate crime laws regarding gender identity.

Three states and the District of Columbia cover homelessness.

Sexual orientation and gender identity

 1983
  No LGBT hate crime statute at the state level
 1984
 California: Sexual orientation covered in hate crime statute
 1987
 Connecticut: Sexual orientation covered in hate crime statute
 1988
 Wisconsin: Sexual orientation covered in hate crime statute
 1989
 Minnesota: Sexual orientation covered in hate crime statute
 Nevada: Sexual orientation covered in hate crime statute
 Oregon: Sexual orientation covered in hate crime statute
 1990
 District of Columbia: Sexual orientation and gender identity covered in hate crime statute
 New Jersey:  Sexual orientation covered in hate crime statute
 Vermont: Sexual orientation covered in hate crime statute
 1991
 Florida: Sexual orientation covered in hate crime statute
 Illinois:  Sexual orientation covered in hate crime statute
 New Hampshire:  Sexual orientation covered in hate crime statute
 1992
 Iowa: Sexual orientation covered in hate crime statute
 Michigan: Sexual orientation included in hate crime data collection only
 1993
 Maine: Sexual orientation covered in hate crime statute
 Minnesota: Gender identity covered in hate crime statute
 Texas: Sexual orientation covered in hate crime statute
 Washington: Sexual orientation covered in hate crime statute
 1996
 Massachusetts: Sexual orientation covered in hate crime statute
 1997
 Delaware: Sexual orientation covered in hate crime statute
 Louisiana: Sexual orientation covered in hate crime statute
 Nebraska: Sexual orientation covered in hate crime statute
 1998
 California: Gender identity covered in hate crime statute
 Rhode Island: Sexual orientation covered in hate crime statute
 1999
 Missouri: Sexual orientation and gender identity covered in hate crime statute
 Vermont: Gender identity covered in hate crime statute
 2000
 Indiana: Sexual orientation included in hate crime data collection only
 Kentucky: Sexual orientation covered in hate crime statute
 New York: Sexual orientation covered in hate crime statute
 Tennessee: Sexual orientation covered in hate crime statute
 2002
 Kansas: Sexual orientation covered in hate crime statute
 Pennsylvania: Sexual orientation and gender identity covered in hate crime statute
 Puerto Rico: Sexual orientation and gender identity covered in hate crime statute
 2003
 Arizona: Sexual orientation covered in hate crime statute
 Hawaii: Sexual orientation and gender identity covered in hate crime statute
 New Mexico: Sexual orientation and gender identity covered in hate crime statute
 2004
 Connecticut: Gender identity covered in hate crime statute
 Georgia: Sexual orientation and gender identity no longer explicitly listed as protected class in hate crime statute by the Supreme Court of Georgia (U.S. state)
 2005
 Colorado: Sexual orientation and gender identity covered in hate crime statute
 Maryland: Sexual orientation and gender identity covered in hate crime statute
 2008
 New Jersey: Gender identity covered in hate crime statute
 Oregon: Gender identity covered in hate crime statute
 Pennsylvania: Sexual orientation and gender identity no longer explicitly listed as protected class in hate crime statute by the Supreme Court of Pennsylvania
 2012
 Massachusetts: Gender identity covered in hate crime statute
 Rhode Island: Gender identity covered in hate crime statute
 2013
 Delaware: Gender identity covered in hate crime statute
 Nevada: Gender identity covered in hate crime statute
 2016
 Illinois: Gender identity covered in hate crime statute
 2019
 Tennessee: Gender Identity covered in hate crime statute
 Indiana: Sexual orientation covered in hate crime statute
 Utah: Sexual orientation and gender identity covered in hate crime statute
 Maine: Sexual orientation and gender identity covered in hate crime statute
 New Hampshire: Gender identity covered in hate crime statute
 Washington State: Gender identity covered in hate crime statute
 New York State: Gender identity covered in hate crime statute
 2020
 Georgia: Sexual orientation covered in hate crime statute
 Virginia: Sexual orientation and gender identity covered in hate crime statute

Police and firefighters
On May 26, 2016, Louisiana was the first state to add police officers and firefighters to their state hate crime statute, when Governor John Bel Edwards signed an amendment from the legislature into law. This amendment was added, in part, as a response to the Black Lives Matter movement, which seeks to end police brutality against black people, with some advocates of the amendment using the slogan "Blue Lives Matter". Since the inception of Black Lives Matter, critics have found some of the movement's rhetoric anti-police, with the author of the amendment, Lance Harris, stating some "were employing a deliberate campaign to terrorize our officers". Despite the killing of a Texas sheriff in 2015 and the killings of two NYPD officers in the previous year, in response to the death of Eric Garner and the shooting of Michael Brown, there was little to no data suggesting hate crimes against law enforcement were a common problem when the bill was passed. A little less than two months after the amendment was passed, Baton Rouge was in the national spotlight after the Baton Rouge Police killing of Alton Sterling by two white police officers. This sparked protests in Baton Rouge, resulting in hundreds of arrests and increased racial tension nationally. In the week during those protests, five police officers were killed in Dallas, and the week after the protests, three more officers were killed in Baton Rouge. Both perpetrators were killed and the motives behind both shootings were responses to the recent killings of Black men by police officers.

In 2017, Kentucky became the second state making it a hate crime to attack police officers or emergency responders. This was part of a trend in "blue lives matter" legislation, encouraged by The Heritage Foundation and ideologues such as Edwin Meese and Bernard Kerik. That same year, Mississippi expanded its hate crime law to cover law enforcement officers, firefighters, and emergency workers. In 2019, Utah added status as a police officer or emergency responder to the list of protected classes. In 2020, Georgia enacted a new law creating the crime of bias-motivated intimidation, applying to attacks on police officers, firefighters, or emergency medical technicians.

Data collection statutes

Hate Crime Statistics Act of 1990 

The Hate Crime Statistics Act of 1990 , requires the Attorney General to collect data on crimes committed because of the victim's race, religion, disability, sexual orientation, or ethnicity.  The bill was signed into law in 1990 by George H. W. Bush, and was the first federal statute to "recognize and name gay, lesbian and bisexual people." Since 1992, the Department of Justice and the FBI have jointly published an annual report on hate crime statistics.

Violent Crime Control and Law Enforcement Act of 1994 

In 1994, the Violent Crime Control and Law Enforcement Act expanded the scope of required FBI data to include hate crimes based on disability, and the FBI began collecting data on disability bias crimes on January 1, 1997. In 1996, Congress permanently reauthorized the Act.

Campus Hate Crimes Right to Know Act of 1997 
The Campus Hate Crimes Right to Know Act of 1997 enacted , which requires campus security authorities to collect and report data on hate crimes committed on the basis of race, gender, religion, sexual orientation, ethnicity, or disability. This bill was brought to the forefront by Senator Robert Torricelli.

Prevalence 
The DOJ and the FBI have gathered statistics on hate crimes reported to law enforcement since 1992 in accordance with the Hate Crime Statistics Act. The FBI's Criminal Justice Information Services Division has annually published these statistics as part of its Uniform Crime Reporting program. According to these reports, of the over 113,000 hate crimes since 1991, 55% were motivated by racial bias, 17% by religious bias, 14% sexual orientation bias, 14% ethnicity bias, and 1% disability bias. David Ray Hate Crimes Prevention Act

Please note that the figures in the table below do not contain data from all reporting agencies every year. 2004 figures covered a population of 254,193,439, 2014 covered 297,926,030.

Covering homeless people 
Florida, Maine, Maryland, and Washington, D.C., have hate crime laws that include the homeless status of an individual.

A 2007 study found that the number of violent crimes against the homeless is increasing. The rate of such documented crimes in 2005 was 30% higher than of those in 1999. 75% of all perpetrators are under the age of 25. Studies and surveys indicate that homeless people have a much higher criminal victimization rate than the non-homeless, but that most incidents never get reported to authorities.

In recent years, largely due to the efforts of the National Coalition for the Homeless (NCH) and academic researchers the problem of violence against the homeless has gained national attention. The NCH called deliberate attacks against the homeless hate crimes in their report Hate, Violence, and Death on Mainstreet USA (they retain the definition of the American Congress).

The Center for the Study of Hate & Extremism (CSHE) at California State University, San Bernardino in conjunction with the NCH found that 155 homeless people were killed by non-homeless people in "hate killings", while 76 people were killed in all the other traditional hate crime homicide categories such as race and religion, combined. The CSHE contends that negative and degrading portrayals of the homeless contribute to a climate where violence takes place.

Debate 

Penalty-enhancement hate crime laws are traditionally justified on the grounds that, in Chief Justice Rehnquist's words, "this conduct is thought to inflict greater individual and societal harm.... bias-motivated crimes are more likely to provoke retaliatory crimes, inflict distinct emotional harms on their victims, and incite community unrest."

Coverage of white people
In a 2001 report, Hate crimes on campus: the problem and efforts to confront it, by Stephen Wessler and Margaret Moss of the Center for the Prevention of Hate Violence at the University of Southern Maine, the authors note that "although there are fewer hate crimes directed against Caucasians than against other groups, they do occur and are prosecuted." The case in which the Supreme Court upheld hate crimes legislation against First Amendment attack, Wisconsin v. Mitchell, 508 U.S. 476 (1993), involved a white victim. Hate crime statistics published in 2002, gathered by the FBI under the auspices of the Hate Crime Statistics Act of 1990, documented over 7,000 hate crime incidents, in roughly one-fifth of which the victims were white people.  However, these statistics have caused dispute.  The FBI's hate crimes statistics for 1993, which similarly reported 20% of all hate crimes to be committed against white people, prompted Jill Tregor, executive director of Intergroup Clearinghouse, to decry it as "an abuse of what the hate crime laws were intended to cover", stating that the white victims of these crimes were employing hate crime laws as a means to further penalize minorities.

James B. Jacobs and Kimberly Potter note that white people, including those who may be sympathetic to the plight of those who are victims of hate crimes by white people, bristle at the notion that hate crimes against whites are somehow inferior to, and less worthy than, hate crimes against other groups.  They observe that while, as stated by Altschiller, no hate crime law makes any such distinction, the proposition has been argued by "a number of writers in prominent publications", who have advocated the removal of hate crimes against whites from the category of hate crime, on the grounds that hate crime laws, in their view, are intended to be affirmative action for "protected groups".  Jacobs and Potter firmly assert that such a move is "fraught with potential for social conflict and constitutional concerns."

The FBI listed 775 victims of anti-white hate crimes in 2019, more than victims of anti-Asian or anti-Arab hate crimes but less than victims of anti-black hate crimes. Between 2008 and 2012, anti-white hate crimes were the 3rd most common form of hate crimes, behind anti-black and anti-LGBT hate crimes (see detailed Hate crime#Victims in the United States).

See also
 Civil Rights Act of 1964
 Civil Rights Act of 1968
 Crime in the United States
 Local Law Enforcement Hate Crimes Prevention Act of 2007

References

External links 
 Database of hate crime statutes by state, via Anti-Defamation League
 [Hate Crimes Bill S. 1105], detailed information on hate crimes bill.
 "Hate Crime." Oxford Bibliographies Online: Criminology. 

Hate crime
United States criminal law by topic
Anti-discrimination law in the United States